Vincent Cimatti SDB also known as Vincenzo Cimatti was a Roman Catholic priest, bishop, prefect apostolic and Salesian provincial to Japan. He is founder of the Caritas Sisters of Jesus. He is the brother of Maria Raffaella Cimatti, a member of the Hospitaler Sisters of Mercy,  who was beatified by the Catholic Church in 1996.

Early life 
Vincent was born on 15 July 1879 in Faenza, Ravenna, Italy to James and Rosa Pasi, the youngest of six children.

Religious life 
He was ordained a priest at the age of 24. He led a group of Salesians to start a Salesian mission in Japan. He was appointed prefect apostolic in 1935.

Death 
Cimatti died on 6 October 1965 in Japan. His body was re-exhumed in 1977 and found to be perfectly intact. His remains are kept in a crypt in Chofu.

Beatification 
He was declared 'The Venerable' on 21 December 1991 by Pope John Paul II.

References 

20th-century Italian Roman Catholic priests
20th-century venerated Christians
Italian venerated Catholics
Italian hermits
Salesians of Don Bosco
Venerated Catholics by Pope John Paul II
1965 deaths
1879 births